is a Japanese singer-songwriter and multi-instrumentalist, who debuted in May 2004 in America with his album Night Piece. He creates every aspect of his music, including the lyrics, music, arrangements, recording and mixing. He is known for the variety of instruments he uses in his music, using over 100 different traditional and non-traditional instruments in his recordings. Tokumaru is also a member of the Japanese rock band Gellers. Tokumaru's 2010 album Port Entropy was his most commercially successful album in Japan, breaking into the top 40.

Biography

Early years 
Shugo Tokumaru was born and raised in Tokyo. His first instrument was the piano, which he started between 5–6 years old after seeing a friend playing it. Much later on in junior high school, Tokumaru started playing the electric guitar, originally playing songs only by The Clash. He joined a band called Gellers, made up of people he had known throughout his childhood. The band formed around 1994 and at the very beginning, Tokumaru was not a member. He started writing songs at 17 for the band, however had not had much of a need to earlier, as the other guitarist of the band was the chief songwriter. At this point, Tokumaru developed an interest with multi-instrumentalization, thinking that just the guitar/bass/drum set of a standard band wasn't enough.

After finishing high school, Tokumaru traveled overseas for 2 and a half years, spending most of his time living in Los Angeles. While staying in America, he was a part of a jazz band, and recorded songs in his home.

Debut 

After returning to Japan in 2003, Tokumaru finished recording a 10 track demo album called Fragment. He gave this demo CD to a friend who was an acquaintance of Trevor Sias, owner of the US independent record label Music Related. The label was impressed with the CD, and wanted to release the demo album just as it was; however, Tokumaru did not like the idea. He created an entirely new album, which was released under the label in the United States on May 11, 2004. Night Piece originally planned to be just an American only release, but due to strong sales on internet sites, it was released in other countries. It was released in Japan in August 2004 through the independent label Compare Notes.

Tokumaru released his second album, L.S.T., in 2006, and his third, Exit, in 2007. During this time, his music started to become more recognized globally. L.S.T. was also released in Europe and New Zealand, with Tokumaru performing on a French and Spanish tour. In Japan, Tokumaru performed live at such places as the Ginza Apple Store and Shinjuku Tower Records, and his music started being featured in commercials for companies such as Shiseido and Japan Airlines. Also in 2007, Tokumaru's childhood band Gellers reformed, releasing their debut album and performing at high-profile festivals, such as the Fuji Rock Festival and Borofesta. However, the group went on hiatus in 2008.

In 2008, Tokumaru worked on soundtrack for Kōji Hagiuda directed film . He performed his first US tour, with four sold out dates in halls with a capacity of around 2,000 people each. He continued to perform at high-profile Japanese music festivals, such as the Fuji Rock Festival (this time as a solo artist) and Asian Kung-Fu Generation's Nano-Mugen Festival.

Commercial success 

In 2009, Sony used Tokumaru's song "Rum Hee" for commercials for their VAIO L series of touchscreen computers. The resulting extended play, Rum Hee, was Tokumaru's first top 100 release. It was later used again in June 2014 by Sumo Digital in the E3 announcement trailer for LittleBigPlanet 3, and an instrumental version of the song was used as the title music when the game was released on November 18, 2014. In 2010, his fourth album Port Entropy broke into the top 40. He performed his first Japanese tour, featuring 13 dates across the country. Every venue was a sold out concert. After the tour, Gellers started performing again in 2010.

Tokumaru's song "Parachute" was featured in soundtrack for Canadian film Year of the Carnivore.

Songwriting 

Shugo Tokumaru considers some of his influences to be The Beach Boys, older Japanese musicians such as Hachidai Nakamura, and traditional Japanese music styles, such as gagaku. Tokumaru plays all of his instruments on his albums, and records his songs alone. Tokumaru sings his lyrics solely in Japanese. The basis of his lyrics come from his daily dream diary. When writing music, he first comes up with a melody solely inside his head. When creating the song, he tries to use as many instruments as possible, to illustrate the different aspects of his dreams.

Discography

Original albums 
{| class="wikitable" style="text-align:center"
! Year
!Album information
!Release date
!OriconAlbumsCharts
!Reportedsales
|-
|2003
|align=left|Fragment

|2003
|—
|—
|-
|2004
|align=left|Night Piece

|May 11, 2004
|—
|—
|-
|2005
|align=left|L.S.T. 

|August 25, 2005
|—
|—
|-
|2007
|align=left|Exit

| October 19, 2007
|239
|1,400
|-
|2010
|align=left|Port Entropy

|April 21, 2010
|33
|10,000
|-
|2012
|align=left|In Focus?

|November 7, 2012
|—
|—
|-
|2016
|align=left|Toss

|October 19, 2016 (Japan), April 28, 2017 (North America)
|—
|—
|}

 Other albums 

 Singles 
 "Vista" (January 2006, vinyl single)
 "Sleigh Ride" (November 25, 2009, digital download)

 Other appearances 
 "Sleeping Bird (Remixed by Shugo Tokumaru)" (February 2006, Apartment's Apremix album)
 "Tournament (Remixed by Shugo Tokumaru)" (March 2007, Moools' "Tournament" remix single)
  (June 2007, various artists album Akairo Elegy Mania, featuring just covers of Morio Agata's song of the same name)
 "Spiderwoman w/ Shugo Tokumaru" (January 2008, David Fenech's album Polochon Battle)
 "Micro Guitar Music" (July 2008, various artists Kyokutō Saizensen 2)
 "With Pail (Shugo Tokumaru Remix)" (July 2008, .Tape. remix album .Tape. Repainted)
  (July 2009, Unicorn URMX)
 "401 Circuit (Shugo Tokumaru Remix)" (March 2010, I Am Robot and Proud remix album Uphill City Remixes & Collaborations)
Vicious Circles Vol 1 (Digital)
 "Video Killed The Radio Star" (September 2011, Polyvinyl Records's Japan 3.11.11: A Benefit Album'')

References

External links 
 

Living people
1980 births
Japanese male singer-songwriters
Japanese singer-songwriters
Lil' Chief Records artists
Singers from Tokyo
21st-century Japanese singers
21st-century Japanese male singers